The Catholic Union of Great Britain is an association of Roman Catholic laypeople in England, Wales, and Scotland. It works with the Catholic Bishops’ Conference of England and Wales and the Catholic Bishop's Conference of Scotland. The membership of the Catholic Union includes people from all parts of the country and all walks of life. It includes doctors, nurses, teachers, lawyers, and civil servants. It represents a wealth of lay Catholic experience and expertise. The Union's purpose is to promote a Christian standpoint in public affairs.
Among its methods are:

 Lobbying both houses of Parliament
 Through the media
 Through the submission of papers to government Ministers and Departments
 Through conferences and public functions
 Through the work of its committees and its members

The current President of the Catholic Union is Sir Edward Leigh. The first President was Henry Fitzalan-Howard, 15th Duke of Norfolk.

See also 
 George Robinson, 1st Marquess of Ripon

External links

References 

Catholic advocacy groups
Catholic Church in the United Kingdom